Ana Catarina Silva Pereira (born 19 November 1992) is a Portuguese futsal goalkeeper who plays for Benfica and the Portugal futsal women's national team. She won the award for Best Goalkeeper in the World on the 2018 Futsal Awards.

Honours
Benfica
Campeonato Nacional Futsal Feminino: 2016–17, 2017–18, 2018–19
Taça de Portugal de Futsal Feminino: 2013–14, 2015–16, 2016–17, 2017–18, 2018–19
Supertaça de Futsal Feminino de Portugal: 2016–17, 2017–18

Lazio
Supercoppa Italiana: 2014–15

International
UEFA Women's Futsal Championship runner-up: 2019
Women's Futsal World Tournament runner-up: 2010, 2012, 2014

Individual
Best Goalkeeper in the World: 2018

References

1992 births
Living people
People from Vila Franca de Xira
S.L. Benfica futsal players
Portuguese women's futsal players
Sportspeople from Lisbon District